Digger (Roderick Krupp) is a fictional character appearing in American comic books published by Marvel Comics. He first appeared as a story narrator/host in the horror anthology series  Tower of Shadows #1 (September 1969), in the story "At the Stroke of Midnight" by writer-artist Jim Steranko.

Publication history
Originally designed as one of the hosts of Tower of Shadows and its sister title, Chamber of Darkness, both beginning in 1969, Digger played a role similar to that of Tales from the Crypt's The Crypt Keeper of the 1950s EC Comics and later HBO television series. Providing a panel or two of introductory material leading into and usually closing the story itself, Digger appeared sporadically through the nine-issue run of Tower of Shadows and the eight-issue run of Chamber of Darkness.

Digger was worked into Marvel's main shared universe, the Marvel Universe in 1987, returning with other lesser-known characters in Captain America #329 (May 1987). He appeared with these other characters as a member of the team the Night Shift, supervillain antagonists who were then primarily used in the series Avengers West Coast during the 1990s.

Digger appeared as part of the "Night Shift" entry in The Official Handbook of the Marvel Universe Update '89 #5.

After a long period in which the character had no appearances, a new version of Digger appeared in 2008. Returning to his roots, he was used as the narrator for Dead of Night featuring the Man-Thing, a four-issue miniseries published by Marvel as a part of its mature content MAX imprint. In this series, Digger tells his version of the Man-Thing's origin, as well as three other semi-connected tales starring the Man-Thing and other characters related to that protagonist. The Digger sequences in the miniseries were painted by artist Nick Percival.

In 2009, the Marvel Universe version of Digger appeared in Marvel Zombies 4. This series also featured the character's (very temporary) death and undead resurrection.

Fictional character biography
Digger generally is depicted with green skin, although in some instances it appears blue.

Roderick Krupp, a serial killer who buried his victims alive while telling them macabre stories, became known as Digger for his modus operandi. Living in a decrepit Los Angeles, California mansion known as the Tower of Shadows, he was eventually contacted by the vigilante the Shroud and recruited for the supervillain team the Night Shift. The team made the mansion its headquarters. Krupp was eventually apprehended by the Mockingbird of the superhero team the Avengers.

Digger appears with the Night Shift, as part of the Hood's gang. They battle the Midnight Sons, and Digger fights Morbius, the Living Vampire, who breaks Digger's shovel and buries it into his skull. He and the Night Shift are killed when the zombie virus from the Marvel Zombies' Earth mutates and becomes airborne. The virus cloud begins to rain blood, and reanimates the Night Shift as zombies. Dormammu assumes control of the Night Shift and uses them to fight the Midnight Sons. When Jennifer Kale and the Black Talon contain the virus within the Zombie (Simon Garth), the Night Shift members, although still in an undead state of being, halt their rampage. The Hood teleports away with them.

Digger and the rest of the Night Shift are hired by Snapdragon to kill the Moon Knight on behalf of Count Nefaria who was operating as the Kingpin of Los Angeles. When they fail and are bailed out of prison by Snapdragon's lawyer, Count Nefaria reduces Digger, Dansen Macabre, the Needle, the Tatterdemalion, Tick-Tock, and the Misfit to ashes.

During the "Spider-Geddon" storyline, Digger and Dansen Macabre turn up alive as they, the Brothers Grimm, Skein, and new member Waxman rob a bus of people, only to be thwarted by the Superior Octopus. The Superior Octopus agrees to spare them more pain in exchange that the Night Shift becomes his agents, where he will compensate them from his own funds. They agree to the terms and are ordered to return the stolen items. The Superior Octopus leaves, advising them never to cross him or they will not live long enough to regret it.

Powers and abilities
Digger has a slightly superhuman level of strength and excellent regeneration. He also feels little to no pain.

Other versions

Marvel MAX 
Digger hosts Dead of Night Featuring the Man-Thing, a four-issue miniseries starring an alternate continuity version of the Man-Thing.

References

External links
 Digger at Marvel.com
 Digger at Comicvine
 Roderick Krupp at Marvel Wikia
 

Comics characters introduced in 1969
Fictional serial killers
Marvel Comics characters with accelerated healing
Marvel Comics characters with superhuman strength
Marvel Comics male supervillains
Marvel Comics supervillains